Faith McNulty (November 28, 1918 – April 10, 2005) was an American non-fiction author, probably best known for her 1980 literary journalism genre book The Burning Bed. She is also known for her authorship of wildlife pieces and books, including children's books.

Biography
Faith Trumbull Corrigan was born in New York City, November 28, 1918. She was the daughter of a judge. She attended Barnard College for one year, then attended Rhode Island State College. But she dropped out of college once she got a job as a copy girl at the New York Daily News. She later went to work for Life magazine. She worked for the United States Office of War Information in London during World War II.

McNulty was a staff writer at The New Yorker magazine from 1953 to 1994. In 1980, a collection of her New Yorker work was published as The Wildlife Stories of Faith McNulty. For many years, she edited the annual New Yorker compilation of the year's best children's books.

She also frequently wrote children's books on wildlife, including How to Dig a Hole to the Other Side of the World in 1979 and When I Lived With Bats in 1998. Her 1966 book The Whooping Crane: The Bird that Defies Distinction was written for adults.

Her husband, John McNulty, was also a writer for The New Yorker and with Thomas Wolfe, Truman Capote, Gay Talese and James Baldwin, a major figure in the development of the literary genre of Creative nonfiction, which is also known as literary journalism or literature in fact. As earlier here noted, having herself been years exposed to Harold Ross' New Yorker magazine's rarefied environment, which was then so promoting of this evolving genre, Faith's own major nonfiction work, The Burning Bed, is, itself, a quintessential and quality example of the genre of literary journalism or, as Thomas Wolfe once labeled it, the “New Journalism”.  After her husband John died in 1956, Faith remarried, to Richard Martin, a set designer and an inventive designer of set props.

The Burning Bed was based on the true story of Francine Hughes, who set fire to the bedroom in which her husband was sleeping. Hughes defended herself by saying that her husband had been abusing her for 13 years. The jury at her trial ruled that she had been temporarily insane, and she was found not guilty.

Faith had fonder memories of life with kinder family, however. "I can remember my father in his nightshirt, digging for worms for the baby robin in the bathroom. That's the kind of household it was; I had woodchucks in the bathroom, cats, squirrels, chipmunks", McNulty once said.

Towards the end of her life, she wrote a weekly column for The Providence Journal on a local animal shelter run by the Animal Welfare League. Her mother had founded the Animal Welfare League in southern Rhode Island. McNulty had long been known for taking in stray animals at her farm.

She suffered a stroke in 2004. She died at her farm in Wakefield, Rhode Island.

McNulty's last book was illustrated by Steven Kellogg and published by Scholastic Books in 2005, If You Decide to Go to the Moon—a picture book written in the second person. Next year (after McNulty's death) it won a major "year's best" children's literary award, the Boston Globe–Horn Book Award for Nonfiction.

Selected works
How to Dig a Hole to the Other Side of the World
Dancing with Manatees
The Burning Bed
''The Wildlife Stories of Faith McNulty
Peeping in the Shell: A Whooping Crane Is Hatched
Arty The Smarty
Why Must They Die? The strange case of the prairie dog and the black-footed ferret
Whales: Their Life in the Sea
Listening to Whales Sing
How Whales Walked into the Sea
The Elephant Who Couldn't Forget
Endangered Animals
The Great Whales
Hurricane
If Dogs Ruled the World
The Lady and the Spider
Mouse and Tim
Orphan: The Story of a Baby Woodchuck
Playing With Dolphins
Red Wolves
The Silly Story of a Flea and His Dog
A Snake in the House
With Love from Koko
Woodchuck
 If You Decide to Go to the Moon, illustrated by Steven Kellogg (Scholastic, 2005)

References

External links
Photograph of Faith McNulty in 2003

1918 births
2005 deaths
American children's writers
Children's non-fiction writers
American nature writers
People of the United States Office of War Information
American women civilians in World War II